FRVT may refer to:

 Fore River Transportation Corporation
 Face Recognition Vendor Test